Florence Bell may refer to:

Florence Bell (writer) (1851–1930), British writer and playwright
Florence Bell (scientist) (1913–2000), British DNA researcher
Florence Bell (skier) (born 1996), British alpine skier
Florence Harrison Bell (1865–1948), British socialist and suffragist activist